Cophixalus timidus is a species of frog in the family Microhylidae. It is endemic to Papua New Guinea. It is threatened by frequent fires set in its habitat.

References

timidus
Amphibians of Papua New Guinea
Amphibians described in 2006